Frans Jozef Theo Rutten (15 September 1899 in Schinnen – 21 April 1980 in Lopik) was a Dutch politician and minister for the Catholic People's Party.

Rutten was from 1931 professor of psychology at the Katholieke Universiteit Nijmegen, succeeding his mentor :nl:Francis Roels. In 1948 he succeeded Jos Gielen as Minister of Education in the First Drees cabinet. He unfolded his first "Onderwijsnota" (teaching note) plans for an integrated approach to secondary education, which Jo Cals would later expand upon. Rutten had 1952 legislation introduced for the training of teachers. After his period as minister, he returned to the sciences.

He was the father of the late-twentieth-century Dutch top economics civil servant .

As Minister of Education, Rutten became infamous in the world of Dutch comics for the letter he had published on October 25, 1948 in the newspaper Het Parool and directly addressed to all educational institutions and local government bodies, advocating the prohibition of comics. In the letter, he had stated, "These booklets, which contain a series of illustrations with accompanying text, are generally sensational in character, without any other value. It is not possible to proceed in a legal manner against printers, publishers or distributors of these novels, nor can anything be achieved by not making paper available to them, since this for those publications necessary paper, is available on the free market," further implying that it became the civil duty of parents, teachers and civil servants, including policemen, to confiscate and destroy comic books wherever they found them. Less than a month later, a 16-year old girl was murdered in a bizarre manner on November 19 in the small town of Enkhuizen by her 15-year old boyfriend, who had tied her down to railroad tracks where she was killed by a passing train. The police subsequently uncovered that both had been readers of comic books of the kind that were in concordance with Rutten's definition. Taken as validation, a witch-hunt ensued, complete with comic book destructions all over the country, nearly destroying the comic phenomenon in the Netherlands, which had only just begun recovering from the war years. In an atmosphere of near-hysteria, all comic publications were suspended forthwith by societal, self-censorship. Considered "healthy", the comic productions of the Toonder Studio's, which included the as literature considered Tom Poes, were the only ones for which an exemption was made. In this respect, Rutten has been to Dutch comics, what Fredric Wertham would six years later become to the American comic world. With Wertham, Rutten had a background in psychology in common.

Publications 
 Franciscus Josephus Theodorus Rutten et al. (Ed.) (1955): Menselijke Verhoudening. Bussum: Paul Brand.

Further reading 
 J. F. M. C. Aarts (1985): Rutten, Franciscus Josephus Theodorus (1899-1980) In: Biografisch Woordenboek van Nederland. Den Haag, 1985, Vol. 2, (Online)

References

External links

1899 births
1989 deaths
Dutch psychologists
Dutch Roman Catholics
Catholic People's Party politicians
20th-century Dutch politicians
Rectors of universities in the Netherlands
Ministers of Education of the Netherlands
People from Schinnen
Utrecht University alumni
Academic staff of Radboud University Nijmegen
20th-century psychologists